A gauge group is a group of gauge symmetries of the Yang–Mills gauge theory of principal connections on a principal bundle. Given a principal bundle  with a structure Lie group , a gauge group is defined to be a group of its vertical automorphisms. This group is isomorphic to the group  of global sections of the associated group bundle  whose typical fiber is a group  which acts on itself by the adjoint representation.

At the same time, gauge gravitation theory exemplifies field theory on a principal frame bundle whose gauge symmetries are general covariant transformations which are not elements of a gauge group.

In the physical literature on gauge theory, a structure group of a principal bundle often is called the gauge group.

In quantum gauge theory, one considers a normal subgroup  of a gauge group  which is the stabilizer

 

of some point  of a group bundle . It is called the pointed gauge group. This group acts freely on a space of principal connections. Obviously, . One also introduces the effective gauge group  where  is the center of a gauge group . This group  acts freely on a space of irreducible principal connections.

If a structure group  is a complex semisimple matrix group, the Sobolev completion  of a gauge group  can be introduced. It is a Lie group. It is a configuration space of quantum gauge theory.

References 
 Mitter, P., Viallet, C., On the bundle of connections and the gauge orbit manifold in Yang – Mills theory, Commun. Math. Phys. 79 (1981) 457.
 Marathe, K., Martucci, G., The Mathematical Foundations of Gauge Theories (North Holland, 1992) .
 Mangiarotti, L., Sardanashvily, G., Connections in Classical and Quantum Field Theory (World Scientific, 2000)

See also 
Gauge symmetry (mathematics)
Gauge theory
Gauge theory (mathematics)
Principal bundle

Differential geometry
Gauge theories
Theoretical physics